Noah Pilato (born June 25, 1996) is an American soccer player who plays as a midfielder for Greenville Triumph SC in USL League One.

Career

Amateur
After playing for D.C. United Academy and Oakton High School, Pilato played college soccer at Penn State.

Professional
Pilato signed with his local team, Loudoun United FC on March 7, 2019. He scored his first professional goal on May 11, 2019 against the Charlotte Independence.

For the 2020 season, Pilato joined Greenville Triumph SC of USL League One. He scored a goal in a preseason win by the Triumph against USL Championship side North Carolina FC on February 29, 2020. Pilato scored his first professional goal for the Triumph on August 22, 2020, in a 1–0 win against Fort Lauderdale CF.

References

External links
Profile at Penn State

1996 births
Living people
American soccer players
Association football midfielders
Loudoun United FC players
Oakton High School alumni
Penn State Nittany Lions men's soccer players
Soccer players from Virginia
South Florida Surf players
Sportspeople from Fairfax County, Virginia
USL Championship players
USL League Two players